The Arpelistock is a mountain of the Bernese Alps, located on the border between the Swiss cantons of Bern and Valais. It belongs to the massif of the Wildhorn and lies approximately halfway between the Sanetsch Pass and the summit of the Wildhorn.

The north side of the Arpelistock is covered by a glacier named Geltengletscher.

References

External links
Arpelistock on Hikr

Mountains of the Alps
Alpine three-thousanders
Bernese Alps
Mountains of Switzerland
Mountains of the canton of Bern
Mountains of Valais
Bern–Valais border